Go West Young Man is the sixth studio album by American singer-songwriter Michael W. Smith, released on October 1, 1990 through Reunion. This record was his first attempt at mainstream success. It was successful, as it scored a Billboard Hot 100 top ten hit with "Place in This World", which peaked at number 6 on the Billboard Hot 100 chart in 1991.

Background 

Michael W. Smith most notably performed "Place in This World", which peaked at number 6 on the US Billboard Hot 100 and number 3 on Cash Box (#5 AC), and "For You" on various shows, for example The Arsenio Hall Show, to promote the album. The record was a mainstream crossover success for Smith and became a platinum album. Videos were produced for both singles released and received much radio airplay. Several of the songs from this album made it into his greatest hits album, The First Decade (1983-1993).

Track listing

Personnel 
 Michael W. Smith – lead vocals, keyboards, keyboard programming, backing vocals (2), acoustic piano (9)
 Mike Lawler – additional keyboards (1, 3, 6, 7, 9, 10), Hammond B3 organ (5), programming (6, 10), synth bass (6, 10), drums (6, 10), percussion (6, 10), synth solo (7), keyboard programming
 Bryan Lenox – additional keyboards (1, 7), percussion (2, 3, 4, 6–10), drums (3, 4, 6, 7, 9),  keyboard programming
 Trace Scarborough – keyboard  programming
 Dann Huff – guitar (1, 2, 3, 6, 8, 9)
 Jerry McPherson – guitar (4, 5, 7, 9)
 Will Owsley – guitar (4),  guitar solo (4)
 Chris Rodriguez – backing vocals (1, 2, 5, 10), guitar (10)
 Tommy Sims – bass guitar (1, 2, 5, 8), synth bass (4), stick bass (9), keyboard programming
 Matt Pierson – synth bass (3), fretless bass (7)
 Paul Leim – drums (1, 2, 5, 8), percussion (2)
 Terry McMillan – percussion (1–9)
 Mark Douthit – saxophones (1, 3, 4)
 Sam Levine – saxophones (2, 6)
 Barry Green – trombone (1–4), trombone solo (4)
 Chris McDonald – horn arrangements (1–4, 6), trombone (6)
 Mike Haynes – trumpet (1, 3, 4, 6)
 George Tidwell – trumpet (1)
 The Nashville String Machine – strings (3, 8, 9)
 Ronn Huff – string arrangements and conductor (3, 8, 9)
 Carl Gorodetzsky – concertmaster and contractor (3, 8, 9)
 Chris Eaton – backing vocals (1, 2, 4, 7)
 Wayne Kirkpatrick – backing vocals (1, 2, 4, 7, 10)
 Jimmy Marks – backing vocals (2)
 Chris Harris – backing vocals (4, 6, 7, 10)
 Vince Ebo – backing vocals (5)
 Vicki Hampton – backing vocals (5, 6)
 The American Boychoir – choir (9); Nathan Wadley – soloist
 Africa Children's Choir (6); arranged by Michael W. Smith and Ronn Huff; Choir director – Gertrude Kafeero; Tour leader – Darla Peters

Production 
 Producer – Michael W. Smith
 Co-producer – Bryan Lenox
 Vocal Producer – Wayne Kirkpatrick
 Executive Producers – Michael Blanton and Terry Hemmings
 Engineers – Bill Deaton, Pasquale Delvillagio, Pat Hutchinson, Gregg Jampol, Patrick Kelly, Brent King, Bryan Lenox, Don Martin, Dave Murphy, Rick Rowe, Bret Teegarden, and Bill Whittington.
 Mixed by Humberto Gatica 
 Mix Assistants – David Parker and Alejandro Rodriguez
 Recorded at BMG Studio (New York, NY); Sound-trek Studio (Kansas City, MO); Deer Valley Studio (Franklin, TN); Treasure Isle, OmniSound, The Benson Studio, Digital Recorders and Sixteenth Avenue Sound (Nashville, TN).
 Mixed at Sixteenth Avenue Sound (Nashville, TN).
 Edited by Nick Palladino at Scene Three, Inc. (Nashville, TN).
 Mastered by Stephen Marcussen at Precision Disc Mastering (Hollywood, CA).
 Art Direction – Buddy Jackson and Deb Rhodes
 Design – Beth Middleworth for Jackson Design
 Photography – Mark Tucker
 Styling – Mary Jane Starke
 A&R – Don Donahue and Richard Headen
 MWS personal assistant – Elizabeth Leighton Jones

Certifications

Charts

Accolades
GMA Dove Awards

References 

Michael W. Smith albums
1990 albums
Reunion Records albums